Oriol Elcacho (born August 8, 1979) is a Spanish male model from Barcelona. He is known for being the face of BVLGARI's AQVA. He is referred to as the "Spanish Adonis".

Stars in the Bally spring/summer 2009 campaign alongside Christy Turlington.

References 

1979 births
Living people
IMG Models models
Spanish male models
People from Barcelona